The 2012 IPC Athletics European Championships was a track and field competition for athletes with a disability open to International Paralympic Committee (IPC) affiliated countries within Europe. It was held in Stadskanaal, Netherlands and lasted from 23 to 28 June. The event was held in the Stadskanaal Stadium and was the last major European disability athletics event before the forthcoming 2012 Summer Paralympics in London. Approximately 550 athletes from 38 countries attended the games. Several countries used the Championships to finalise the remaining places for the Paralympics.

Venue

The event was held at the Stadskanaal Stadium.

Format
The 2012 IPC Athletics European Championships was an invitational tournament taking in track and field events. No combined sports were included in the 2012 Championships. Not all events were open to all classifications, with several throwing and jumping events being contested between classifications, which were then decided on a points system. The men's 100m relay was the only event to use mixed classifications as a team, with each leg of the relay contested by a different classification athlete. There were no women's relay events. In total there were 144 events held over 17 disciplines.

Athletes finishing in first place are awarded the gold medal, second place the silver medal and third place the bronze. If only three competitors are available to challenge for an event then no bronze medal is awarded. Some events were classed as 'no medal' events.

Coverage

Events

Opening ceremony

Classification

To ensure competition is as fair and balanced as possible, athletes are classified dependent on how their disability impacts on their chosen event/s. Thus athletes may compete in an event against competitors with a different disability to themselves. Where there are more than one classification in one event, (for example discus throw F54/55/56), a points system is used to determine the winner.

F = field athletes
T = track athletes
11-13 – visually impaired, 11 and 12 compete with a sighted guide
20 – intellectual disability
31-38 – cerebral palsy or other conditions that affect muscle co-ordination and control. Athletes in class 31-34 compete in a seated position; athletes in class 35-38 compete standing.
41-46 – amputation, les autres
51-58 – wheelchair athletes

Schedule

Medal table 

The medal table at the end of Day 5 (28 June).

Source: paralympic.org

Highlights

Broken records
World Records

Multiple medalists
Athletes who have obtained at least three medals.

Participating nations
Below is the list of countries who agreed to participate in the Championships and the requested number of athlete places for each.

See also
2012 European Athletics Championships

Footnotes
Notes

References

External links
 Official web-site

 
World Para Athletics European Championships
IPC Athletics European Championships
IPC Athletics European Championships
International athletics competitions hosted by the Netherlands
Sports competitions in Groningen (province)
Sport in Stadskanaal